Siége Perilous is the third studio album released by the power metal band Kamelot. It was released on August 4, 1998, through Noise Records. It is the first album with Roy Khan on vocals and Casey Grillo on drums, and is the final album to feature David Pavlicko on keyboards.

In Arthurian legend, the Siege Perilous, otherwise known as "The Seat Perilous", is the seat at The Round Table reserved for the knight who would quest for and return the Holy Grail.

Track listing

Notes
 The track listing on the back cover of the CD is incorrect. "Rhydin" is track 6, while "Parting Visions" and "Once a Dream" are shifted down once each. The track listing shown here is the correct version, which is listed in the liner notes.
 The title of track 6 is a reference to the fantasy role-playing world, RhyDin.

Personnel
All information from the album booklet.

Kamelot
 Roy Khan – lead vocals
 Thomas Youngblood – guitars, backing vocals, producer
 David Pavlicko – keyboards
 Glenn Barry – bass guitar
 Casey Grillo – drums

Additional musician
 Tore Østby – acoustic guitar on "Siege"

Production
 Tommy Newton – mixing
 Mark Prator – engineer
 Jim Morris – engineer
 Tom Morris – engineer
 Derek Gores – cover art
 Rachel Youngblood – graphic production, design
 Kim Grillo – photography

References

External links
 

1998 albums
Kamelot albums
Noise Records albums
Albums recorded at Morrisound Recording